Garhakota is a town and a municipality in Sagar district in the state of Madhya Pradesh, India.

Geography
It has an average elevation of 373 metres (1,223 feet).

Demographics
 India census, Garhakota had a population of 26,877. Males constitute 52% of the population and females 48%. Garhakota has an average literacy rate of 67%, higher than the national average of 59.5%: male literacy is 77%, and female literacy is 57%. In Garhakota, 16% of the population is under 6 years of age.

Many archaeological surveys have revealed that it has been a place of importance for many civilizations.

Pt. Gopal Bhargav, who is currently the PWD Minister in MP government, comes from this town.

It comes under the Rehli constituency and is well developed in comparison to other towns of Sagar district

Tourism
Shree 1008 Parshvanatha Digambar Jain Atishay Kshetra Pateriaji

This temple is more than 200 years old. It was built by Seth Radha Kishanjun Shah out of his one day earnings from the cotton trade in 1782 A.D. (V.S. 1839). The principal deity of Pateria is Lord Parsvanath (The 23rd Teerthankar). This idol is two metres in height in Padmasana posture built with back stone with three serpent hoods. The spire of this temple is 27 metres high surrounded by a thick wall.
Shri Dig. Jain Chaudhari Mandir

This temple was built in 1891(V.S. 1948), has an eighteen metre high spire. It consists 63 idols, moolnayak of this temple is an idol of Lord Parsvanath with its 1,000 serpent hoods.

Shri. Dig. Jain Mahaveer Jinalay

This newly built jain temple in town Garhakota is one of the best jain temple in whole Sagar district. This was built in year 2015. A world famous Panchkalyanak held in Garhakota after 250 years from 25-12-2015 to 30-12-2015 for this very famous Jain temple.The mulnayak of this temple is well known by its name Lord Mahaveer the 24th and last tirthankar of this yug of Jainism.With the'' blessings of Puja Gurudev shree Kanji Swami this temple have the best infrastructure in comparison with others in complete Sagar district.

Garhakota Fort

Garhakota Fort has the rivers Sunar and Gadhairi on its two sides. It covers 11 acres. This fort was the residence of the Rajput Kings of Garhakota. During the first freedom struggle of India in 1857, Rani of Jhansi Lakshmi Bai wrote a letter to Raja Mardan Singh Bahadur of Garhakota to prepare against the British troops and to stop them at Sagar. Mardan Singh and Gunthai Pateriya were killed in the battle. The fort was raided and demolished by Sir Hugh Rose in 1858 in the course of Ghadar.

Pateriya Fort and Jagannathji Temple

Another fort was situated behind the main fort which was the residence of Pateriyas. They were Zameendars of Pateriya Riyasat and close associates of the Rajput Kings of Garhakota. They were Jijhotiya Brahmins. Pateriya was not their original surname. That was their title or "upadhi" which was awarded by the Bundela King Jujhar Singh for their victorious participation in battles against the Moguls in the 17th century. Pateriya Fort, Gopalji Krishna temple, Jagannathji Pateriya Vishnu temple and Shiv temple were built in 16th century AD. The Pateriya fort was abandoned after the Ghadar rampage. Land records evidence are available at the Revenue Office of Rehli tehsil; 1874 acres in name of Munna Lal Patriya of Garhakota, after independence in 1947.

References 

Tourist attractions in Sagar district
Cities and towns in Sagar district
18th-century Jain temples